The 2016–17 season was the seventh in the history of Melbourne City Football Club. In addition to the domestic league, the club competed in the FFA Cup for the third time.

The club won the FFA Cup, its first ever silverware as a senior men's team. On 3 January 2017, manager John van 't Schip resigned from his position to return to the Netherlands and help care for his terminally-ill father. Michael Valkanis was subsequently appointed manager for the remainder of the season.

Players

Transfers

From youth squad

Transfers in

Transfers out

Contract extensions

Pre-season and friendlies

Competitions

Overall record

A-League

League table

Results summary

Results by round

Matches

Finals series

FFA Cup

Statistics

Appearances and goals
Includes all competitions. Players with no appearances not included in the list.

Disciplinary record
Includes all competitions. The list is sorted by squad number when total cards are equal. Players with no cards not included in the list.

Clean sheets
Includes all competitions. The list is sorted by squad number when total clean sheets are equal. Numbers in parentheses represent games where both goalkeepers participated and both kept a clean sheet; the number in parentheses is awarded to the goalkeeper who was substituted on, whilst a full clean sheet is awarded to the goalkeeper who was on the field at the start of play. Goalkeepers with no clean sheets not included in the list.

References

External links
 Official Website

Melbourne City
Melbourne City FC seasons